Spacewar, Space Wars, or variation, may refer to:

Space warfare, war in outer space

Video gaming
Spacewar!, a 1962 game for the PDP-1, one of the earliest examples of a video game.
Spacewar, a Steamworks integration tool/test game, delivered to developers for games on Steam
Space Wars, a 1977 vector graphics arcade game
Space War, a 1978 video game for the Atari VCS

See also
The War in Space (1977 film) Japanese science-fiction film
Interstellar war